
Gmina Jędrzejów is an urban-rural gmina (administrative district) in Jędrzejów County, Świętokrzyskie Voivodeship, in south-central Poland.

Villages
Apart from the town of Jędrzejów, Gmina Jędrzejów contains the villages and settlements of Borki, Borów, Brus, Brynica Sucha, Chorzewa, Chwaścice, Cierno-Zaszosie, Diament, Gozna, Ignacówka, Jasionna, Książe-Skroniów, Kulczyzna, Łączyn, Lasków, Lścin, Ludwinów, Łysaków Drugi, Łysaków Kawęczyński, Łysaków pod Lasem, Mnichów, Piaski, Podchojny, Podlaszcze, Potok Mały, Potok Wielki, Prząsław, Prząsław Mały, Przysów, Raków, Skroniów, Sudół, Węgleniec, Wilanów, Wolica, Wólka, Wygoda and Zagaje.

Neighbouring gminas
Gmina Jędrzejów is bordered by the gminas of Imielno, Małogoszcz, Nagłowice, Oksa, Sędziszów, Sobków and Wodzisław.

References
Polish official population figures 2006

Jedrzejow
Jędrzejów County